"Heartbeat" is a song by Scottish pop singer-songwriter Jimmy Somerville, formerly the lead vocalist of the bands Bronski Beat and Communards. Released in January 1995 as the first single from his second solo album, Dare to Love (1995), it peaked at #24 on the UK Singles Chart in February of that year and at #15 in his native Scotland. The song also topped the US Billboard Hot Dance Club Play for one week in April 1995, becoming Somerville's first (and, to date, only) solo #1 on that chart. Backing vocals on the song are performed by American dance music singers Shawn Christopher and Yvonne Gage.

Critical reception
In his weekly UK chart commentary, James Masterton wrote, "This new single marks his re-emergence from a musical lay-off with an inoffensive piece of Hi-NRG pop but not a record that is destined to make major waves on the chart."

Music video
The accompanying music video for "Heartbeat" was filmed in black-and-white. It was later published on YouTube in January 2019.

Credits and personnel

 Jimmy Somerville - lead vocal, writer
 Shawn Christopher - back vocal 
 Yvonne Gage - back vocal
 Richard Stannard - writer
 Matt Rowe - writer
 Stephen Hague - record producer, mix
 Gianfranco Bortolotti - producer
 Danny Weatherspoon - keyboards
 Eric Miller - remix, arranger
 Luca Lauri - mix, arranger
 Massimo Braghieri - arranger

 Mike Drake - remix
 DJ R.A.F. - remix
 Plus Staples - remix
 George Maniatis - edit
 Jeff Luif - engineer, mix
 Tiziano Giupponi - mix
 Mauro Picotto - arranger
 Massimo Castrezzati - arranger
 Roberto Cipro - arranger
 Gary Butcher - writer, producer, (B-side)
 Gary Wilkinson - producer, mix (B-side)

Charts

See also
List of number-one dance singles of 1995 (U.S.)

References

External links
Jimmy Somerville > Discography > Singles & EPs > "Heartbeat" at Discogs

1995 singles
Jimmy Somerville songs
Songs written by Richard Stannard (songwriter)
Song recordings produced by Stephen Hague
Songs written by Matt Rowe (songwriter)
Black-and-white music videos
Songs written by Jimmy Somerville